Nogometni klub TOŠK Tešanj, commonly known as TOŠK Tešanj or just TOŠK is a professional association football club based in the city of Tešanj that is situated in Bosnia and Herzegovina.

TOŠK host their home matches at the Stadion Luke, which has a capacity of 7,000 seats. The club currently plays in the First League of the Federation of Bosnia and Herzegovina.

History

Foundation and First League football
TOŠK was founded in 1927. The club's so far biggest successes so far was when it competed in the First League of Bosnia and Herzegovina in the 1999–2000 season.

After the relegation in that season to the First League of FBiH, TOŠK got relegated to the Second League of FBiH two times. The first time being in the 2002–03 season, after which they got promoted back up in the 2005–06 season, and the second time being in the 2006–07 First League of FBiH season.

Present years
In the 2016–17 Second League of FBiH (Group Center) season, ten years after relegation, TOŠK finished in 1st place that season, and got promoted back up to the First League of FBiH for the 2017–18 season. The club has been playing in the First League of FBiH ever since. 

TOŠK's next big result came in the 2018–19 season when the team made it all the way to the semi-final of the 2018–19 Bosnian Cup. On its way to the semi-final, TOŠK eliminated Goražde, GOŠK Gabela and Zvijezda Gradačac, before succumbing to Široki Brijeg in the semi-final.

Honours

Domestic

League
First League of the Federation of Bosnia and Herzegovina:
Runners-up (2): 1998–99, 2019–20
Second League of the Federation of Bosnia and Herzegovina:
Winners (2): 2005–06 , 2016–17

Cups
Bosnia and Herzegovina Cup:
Semi-finalists (1): 2018–19

Players

Current squad

Players with multiple nationalities
  Ermin Imamović
  Semir Dacić

Club officials

Coaching staff
{|
|valign="top"|

Other information

Managerial history
 Fahrudin Zejnilović (June 30, 1998 – July 1, 2000)
 Nikola Nikić (July 1, 2011 – July 10, 2011)
 Igor Remetić (July 1, 2016 – September 11, 2017)
 Denis Sadiković (September 12, 2018 – April 1, 2018)
 Fuad Grbešić (April 2, 2018 – April 22, 2018)
 Ajdin Mrguda (April 27, 2018 – September 10, 2018)
 Fuad Grbešić (September 13, 2018 – December 31, 2018)
 Ajdin Mrguda (February 1, 2019 – June 10, 2019)
 Nusret Muslimović (June 28, 2019 – September 1, 2019)
 Arnes Handžić (interim) (September 2, 2019 – September 8, 2019)
 Nermin Šabić (September 8, 2019 – December 23, 2019)
 Igor Remetić (January 3, 2020 – September 6, 2020)
 Dženan Zaimović (September 19, 2020 – present)

References

External links
NK TOŠK Tešanj at NSFBiH
NK TOŠK Tešanj at Facebook

 
Association football clubs established in 1927
1927 establishments in Bosnia and Herzegovina
Football clubs in Bosnia and Herzegovina